Reggio Calabria Cathedral is a Roman Catholic cathedral in Reggio Calabria, Calabria, Italy. The dedication is to the Assumption of the Virgin Mary. Formerly the archiepiscopal seat of the Archdiocese of Reggio Calabria, it is now that of the Archdiocese of Reggio Calabria-Bova.

The cathedral was severely damaged by an earthquake in 1908, and rebuilt in a modern eclectic style with Romanesque and Gothic elements. The initial design was by the engineer P. Carmelo Umberto Angiolini and then modified by the engineer Mariano Francesconi. The new church was consecrated in 1928.

References

Roman Catholic cathedrals in Italy
Roman Catholic churches completed in 1928
Roman Catholic churches in Reggio Calabria
Buildings and structures in Reggio Calabria
Cathedrals in Calabria
Minor basilicas in Calabria
Gothic Revival church buildings in Italy
20th-century Roman Catholic church buildings in Italy